National Highway 348, commonly called JNPT Road or NH348, previously knows as NH-4B is a 6 lane access controlled national highway in  India. It is an upgradation of 4 lane NH-4B into 6 lane controlled access highway under JNPT port road connectivity project. NH-348 traverses the city of South Navi Mumbai,Maharashtra in India.

Route
Palaspe - Jawaharlal Nehru Port Trust.

Junctions  

 Terminal near Palspe.

See also 
 List of National Highways in India
 List of National Highways in India by state

References

External links 

 NH 348 on OpenStreetMap

National highways in India
National Highways in Maharashtra
Transport in Navi Mumbai